In geometry, the hyperplane separation theorem is a theorem about disjoint convex sets in n-dimensional Euclidean space. There are several rather similar versions. In one version of the theorem, if both these sets are closed and at least one of them is compact, then there is a hyperplane in between them and even two parallel hyperplanes in between them separated by a gap. In another version, if both disjoint convex sets are open, then there is a hyperplane in between them, but not necessarily any gap.  An axis which is orthogonal to a separating hyperplane is a separating axis, because the orthogonal projections of the convex bodies onto the axis are disjoint.

The hyperplane separation theorem is due to Hermann Minkowski. The Hahn–Banach separation theorem generalizes the result to topological vector spaces.

A related result is the supporting hyperplane theorem.

In the context of support-vector machines, the optimally separating hyperplane or maximum-margin hyperplane is a hyperplane which separates two convex hulls of points and is equidistant from the two.

Statements and proof 
The summary of the results are as follows:

The number of dimensions must be finite. In infinite-dimensional spaces there are examples of two closed, convex, disjoint sets which cannot be separated by a closed hyperplane (a hyperplane where a continuous linear functional equals some constant) even in the weak sense where the inequalities are not strict.

Here, the compactness in the hypothesis cannot be relaxed; see an example in the next section. This version of the separation theorem does generalize to infinite-dimension; the generalization is more commonly known as the Hahn–Banach separation theorem.

The proof is based on the following lemma:

Since a separating hyperplane cannot intersect the interiors of open convex sets, we have a corollary:

Case with possible intersections 
If the sets  have possible intersections, but their relative interiors are disjoint, then the proof of the first case still applies with no change, thus yielding:

in particular, we have the supporting hyperplane theorem.

Converse of theorem 

Note that the existence of a hyperplane that only "separates" two convex sets in the weak sense of both inequalities being non-strict obviously does not imply that the two sets are disjoint. Both sets could have points located on the hyperplane.

Counterexamples and uniqueness 

If one of A or B is not convex, then there are many possible counterexamples.  For example, A and B could be concentric circles.  A more subtle counterexample is one in which A and B are both closed but neither one is compact.  For example, if A is a closed half plane and B is bounded by one arm of a hyperbola, then there is no strictly separating hyperplane:

(Although, by an instance of the second theorem, there is a hyperplane that separates their interiors.)  Another type of counterexample has A compact and B open.  For example, A can be a closed square and B can be an open square that touches A.

In the first version of the theorem, evidently the separating hyperplane is never unique.  In the second version, it may or may not be unique.  Technically a separating axis is never unique because it can be translated; in the second version of the theorem, a separating axis can be unique up to translation.

The horn angle provides a good counterexample to many hyperplane separations. However, if  is closed polytope then such a separation exists.

More variants 
Farkas' lemma and related results can be understood as hyperplane separation theorems when the convex bodies are defined by finitely many linear inequalities.

More results may be found.

Use in collision detection
In collision detection, the hyperplane separation theorem is usually used in the following form:

Regardless of dimensionality, the separating axis is always a line.
For example, in 3D, the space is separated by planes, but the separating axis is perpendicular to the separating plane.

The separating axis theorem can be applied for fast collision detection between polygon meshes. Each face's normal or other feature direction is used as a separating axis. Note that this yields possible separating axes, not separating lines/planes.

In 3D, using face normals alone will fail to separate some edge-on-edge non-colliding cases. Additional axes, consisting of the cross-products of pairs of edges, one taken from each object, are required.

For increased efficiency, parallel axes may be calculated as a single axis.

See also 
Dual cone
Farkas's lemma
Kirchberger's theorem
Optimal control

Notes

References

External links

 Collision detection and response

Theorems in convex geometry
Hermann Minkowski
Linear functionals

fr:Séparation des convexes